HNK Primorac is a Croatian football club based in town of Biograd na Moru.

The club took part in the 2007 Croatian Cup, when it was eliminated in the round of 16.

Sources

Football clubs in Croatia
Football clubs in Zadar County
Association football clubs established in 1919
1919 establishments in Croatia